Mika Ojala (born 21 June 1988) is a Finnish professional footballer who plays as a midfielder. He began his senior club career playing for VG-62, before signing with Inter Turku at age 18 in 2006.

Ojala made his international debut for Finland in January 2010, at the age of 21.

Club career

VG-62

Ojala started his football career in Paimion Haka and later moved to Inter Turku's junior system. He made his debut on senior level at the age of 16 in Inter Turku's reserve team VG-62.

Inter Turku

He gained his first appearance in Veikkausliiga during season 2006.

On 17 November 2008 Ojala joined the Dutch club Heerenveen for a one-week-trial together with Wilhelm Ingves from IFK Mariehamn. He visited FC Zürich in 2006.

Häcken

On 9 November 2012, after his contract with Inter had expired, it was announced that Ojala had signed a three-year contract with Swedish topflight club BK Häcken, joining with compatriot Kari Arkivuo.

Return to Inter Turku

He returned to Inter Turku in February 2014 when he signed a contract for season 2014.

Aalen

In the beginning of July 2015 Ojala transferred to German 3. Liga side VfR Aalen.

International career
Ojala was selected in the Finnish national squad by Stuart Baxter in August 2008. He was also a member of the U21 squad that reached the 2009 UEFA European Under-21 Football Championship. Ojala made his national team debut on 18 January 2010 as he came from the bench to replace Roni Porokara in friendly match against South Korea at Málaga, Spain where Finland had winter training camp. Ojala gained his second appearance for the national team on 10 August 2011 at Skonto Stadium in a friendly match against Latvia when he and Timo Furuholm replaced Teemu Pukki and Mika Ääritalo as forwards.

Career statistics

Club

International

Statistics accurate as of matches played on 24 January 2014

Honours and achievements

Club
Inter Turku
Veikkausliiga: 2008
Finnish League Cup: 2008
Finnish Cup: 2009

Individual
Veikkausliiga Player of the Month: August 2008, June 2011, July 2011
Veikkausliiga Midfielder of the Year: 2008, 2011, 2012

References

External links

 VfR Aalen official profile 
 
 
 
 
 

1988 births
Living people
Finnish footballers
Finnish expatriate footballers
Finland international footballers
Finland under-21 international footballers
People from Paimio
FC Inter Turku players
BK Häcken players
VfR Aalen players
Veikkausliiga players
Allsvenskan players
3. Liga players
Finnish expatriate sportspeople in Sweden
Finnish expatriate sportspeople in Germany
Expatriate footballers in Sweden
Expatriate footballers in Germany
Association football wingers
Sportspeople from Southwest Finland